Leach or Leach Steamer was an veteran era American automobile company in Everett, MA  from 1899 to 1901

History 
John M. Leach turned his Everett Cycle Company into Leach Motor Vehicle Company in 1899.  The Leach car was a runabout steamer built on a frame of steel tubing with suspension by three elliptical springs.  The boiler was fed automatically and the fuel was gasoline.  In 1901 the company was closed.

References

Steam cars
Defunct motor vehicle manufacturers of the United States
Veteran vehicles
1890s cars
1900s cars
Motor vehicle manufacturers based in Massachusetts
Cars introduced in 1899
Vehicle manufacturing companies established in 1899
Vehicle manufacturing companies disestablished in 1901